The Ministry of Foreign Affairs and International Cooperation (MoFAIC) is a government ministry in the United Arab Emirates responsible for overseeing the country's diplomatic relations as well as its foreign policy. The ministry is also responsible for maintaining UAE's government offices abroad with diplomatic and consular status.

This is a list of foreign ministers of the United Arab Emirates.

1971–1980: Ahmed Bin Khalifa Al Suwaidi
1980–2006: Rashid Abdullah Al Nuaimi 
2006–present: Abdullah bin Zayed Al Nahyan

References

Sources
Rulers.org – Foreign ministers S–Z

External links
 Ministry of Foreign Affairs and International Cooperation

Foreign
Foreign Ministers
Politicians